Palacio de las Cortes is a building in Madrid where the Spanish Congress of Deputies meets.  It is located on the Calle Zorrilla and the Carrera de San Jerónimo, near the Paseo del Prado. It was built by Narciso Pascual Colomer from 1843 to 1850. in the neoclassic style and is one of the most emblematic buildings of Madrid from the 19th century.

The building came to international attention during the attempted coup d'état known in Spain as the '23-F', in 1981. Antonio Tejero, a lieutenant colonel in the Guardia Civil who was an unrepentant Falangist, stormed the Congress of Deputies chamber along with dozens of armed officers, disrupting proceedings to elect Leopoldo Calvo-Sotelo as the new Spanish prime minister. The insurgents opened fire within the chamber though no one was harmed. The deputies were held hostage for 18 hours before the coup unravelled.

The bullet holes are still visible in the plenary and are shown to visitors on guided tours.

References

Government buildings completed in 1850
Legislative buildings in Spain
Neoclassical architecture in Madrid
Palaces in Madrid
Buildings and structures in Cortes neighborhood, Madrid